Cyana rubritermina is a moth of the family Erebidae. It was described by George Thomas Bethune-Baker in 1911. It is found in Ghana and Nigeria.

References

Cyana
Moths described in 1911
Insects of West Africa
Moths of Africa